Psychotria dolichantha is a species of plant in the family Rubiaceae. It is endemic to Jamaica.

References

dolichantha
Near threatened plants
Endemic flora of Jamaica
Taxonomy articles created by Polbot
Taxobox binomials not recognized by IUCN